Thomas Gollwitzer (born 24 July 1966) is a former professional tennis player from Germany.

Biography
Gollwitzer, the eldest son of architect Hans and gym teacher Lisbeth, was born in Deggendorf, West Germany. He began playing tennis aged eight and turned professional in 1991. As a qualifier at the 1992 CA-TennisTrophy in Vienna he made it to the quarter-finals, in a run which included a win over world number 26 Andrei Cherkasov. He also reached the quarter-finals at Bolzano in 1993 as a qualifier and overcame fourth seed Arnaud Boetsch en route, who retired hurt with the German close to victory. Other ATP Tour main draw appearances include two top-tier tournaments. At Monte Carlo in 1994 he lost in the opening round to Stefan Edberg and he also played in the first round at Hamburg.

References

External links
 
 

1966 births
Living people
German male tennis players
People from Deggendorf (district)
Sportspeople from Lower Bavaria
Tennis people from Bavaria
West German male tennis players